The Tuen Mun Rural Committee (TMRC) is a rural committee in Hong Kong. It was founded by rural leader Chan Yat-sen in 1953 with representatives from 29 villages in Tuen Mun. Today the rural committee consisted of 36 villages and 69 village representatives.

History
It was founded on the basis of Tuen Mun Village Kaifong Office which was created by Chan Yat-sen for the betterment of the village affairs and development which also administered Tuen Mun Market. In 1953, it was transformed into a rural committee with representatives from 29 villages, in which Chan became the chairman for six terms. Lau Wong-fat succeeded as chairman in 1970 and served from seventh to twentieth terms until Junius Ho Kwan-yiu took over in 2011. In 2015, Lau Wong-fat retook the chairmanship from Junius Ho.

In 1959, the New Territories villagers protested against the changing of land use by the government which later brought the New Territories Heung Yee Kuk Ordinance into existence. The rural committee has been member of the Heung Yee Kuk, the powerful organ voicing the interests of the villagers and its chairman Lau Wong-fat has been Chairman of the Kuk for more than twenty years. The chairman of the rural committee is also the ex officio member of the Tuen Mun District Council.

List of chairmen
 Chan Yat-sen, 1953–1970
 Lau Wong-fat, 1970–2011
 Junius Ho Kwa-yiu, 2011–2015
 Lau Wong-fat, 2015–2016
 Kenneth Lau, 2016–present

List of villages

 Chung Uk Tsuen
 Fu Tei Tsuen
 Fuk Hang Tsuen (Lower)
 Fuk Hang Tsuen (Upper)
 Ho Tin Tsuen
 Kei Lun Wai
 Kwong Shan Tsuen
 Lam Tei
 Leung Tin Tsuen
 Luen On San Tsuen
 Lung Kwu Tan
 Nai Wai
 Nim Wan
 Po Tong Ha
 San Hing Tsuen
 San Wai Tsai
 Siu Hang Tsuen
 Siu Lam
 So Kwun Wat
 Sun Fung Wai
 Tai Lam Chung
 Tin Fu Tsai
 To Yuen Wai
 Tseng Tau Tsuen (Middle and Lower)
 Tseng Tau Tsuen (Upper)
 Tsing Chuen Wai
 Tsing Shan Tsuen
 Tsz Tin Tsuen
 Tuen Mun Kau Hui
 Tuen Mun San Hui
 Tuen Mun San Tsuen
 Tuen Tsz Wai
 Wo Ping San Tsuen
 Yeung Siu Hang
 Yick Yuen Tsuen

See also
 Indigenous inhabitants (Hong Kong)

References

Tuen Mun
Rural Committees
1953 establishments in Hong Kong